The Olympus SP 500 Ultra Zoom  is a 6.0-megapixel compact ultra-zoom digital camera introduced by Olympus Corporation in 2005.

It features a 2.5" LCD display, a 10x zoom lens, and 5x digital zoom in a compact lightweight body.  It is designed to satisfy the needs of both hobbyist photographers who desire full control over exposure settings and those that need only point and shoot simplicity.

Lens
The lens is an Olympus aspherical glass zoom lens 6.3 – 63mm. The 10x zoom is equivalent to 38-380mm in 35mm photography.

Flash
The camera has a built-in manual pop-up flash.

Movies
Movies with sound can be recorded, the recording time is dependent on the xD card capacity. They are in QuickTime ( .mov) format.

Power Source
The camera uses 4 AA batteries, which can be rechargeable.
The camera also supports an AC adapter (Olympus adapter only).

Sample photos

External links

Steve's Digicams: Olympus SP 500 UZ review
Olympus SP 500 UZ specs

SP-500
Cameras introduced in 2005